The School of Design and Crafts (abbreviated HDK) at the University of Gothenburg is a design school in Gothenburg. It belongs to the Faculty of Fine, Applied and Performing Arts. It was started in 1848 with the name Slöjdföreningens skola.

The main building is on Kristinelundsgatan in Gothenburg. The school also comprises HDK Steneby in Dals Långed.

Notable alumni
 Annika Ekdahl
 Elsa Jernås

See also
Röhsska Museum

References

University of Gothenburg
Art schools in Sweden
Design schools
Buildings and structures in Gothenburg
University departments in Sweden
1848 establishments in Sweden
Educational institutions established in 1848